This is the discography of Masta Ace, an American rapper.

Albums

Solo

with Masta Ace Incorporated

Collaboration

Compilations

Singles
1989 - "Together" b/w "Letter to the Better"
1990 - "Me & the Biz" b/w "I Got Ta"
1990 - "Music Man" b/w "Ace Iz Wild"
1991 - "Movin' On" b/w "Go Where I Send Thee"
1992 - "Jeep Ass Niguh" b/w "Saturday Nite Live"
1993 - "SlaughtaHouse" b/w "Style Wars [Remix]"
1993 - "Saturday Nite Live [Horny Mix]" b/w "Saturday Nite Live [L.A. Jay Remix]"
1994 - "Born to Roll"
1995 - "The I.N.C. Ride" b/w "The Phat Kat Ride"
1995 - "Sittin' on Chrome"
1996 - "Turn It Up" b/w "Top Ten List"
1998 - "Cars" b/w "Keep Livin"
1998 - "Yeah Yeah Yeah"
1999 - "NY Confidential"
1999 - "NFL [Not For Long]"
1999 - "Express Delivery"
2000 - "Spread It Out" b/w "Hellbound [H&H Remix]"
2000 - "Brooklyn Blocks" b/w "Last Bref"
2000 - "Conflict"
2000 - "So Now U a MC?"
2000 - "Ghetto Like" b/w "The Outcome"
2001 - "Don't Understand" b/w "Acknowledge"
2002 - "Hellbound" (with Eminem and J-Black)
2004 - "Good Ol' Love" b/w "The Ways"
2004 - "Beautiful" (released with Koolade)
2004 - "Da Grind" b/w "Do It Man"
2006 - "The Hitman" b/w "Just Get Down" (released with Strick)
2007 - "Hurting" f/ The Problemaddicts
2012 - "Slow Down"
2012 - "The dangerous three" (with Brother Ali and R.A. The rugged man)
2017 - "Come a Long Way" (Son of Sam featuring Large Professor and Masta Ace)
2017 - "Come a Long Way - Extra P remix" (Son of Sam featuring Large Professor and Masta Ace, produced by Large Professor)
2019 - "E.A.T" (featuring Evidence, produced by DJ Premier, mixed by Marco Polo)
2019 - "Masta Polo" (produced by Marco Polo, B-Side of E.A.T single)

Album chart positions

Singles chart positions

References

Ace, Masta
Discographies of American artists